Jaunpiebalga Municipality is a former municipality in Vidzeme, Latvia. The municipality was formed in 2009 by merging Jaunpiebalga Parish and Zosēni Parish the administrative centre being Jaunpiebalga. As of 2020, the population was 1,982.

On 1 July 2021, Jaunpiebalga Municipality ceased to exist and its territory was merged into Cēsis Municipality.

See also 
 Administrative divisions of Latvia (2009)

References 

 
Former municipalities of Latvia